Buddhanin Sirippu is a 2015 Tamil language drama film directed by Victor Davidson. The film stars Samuthirakani and Mahesh. Mithra Kurian, Vivek and others were also in the cast. Music for the film was composed by Alimirzaq and the film opened to mixed reviews in June 2015.

Cast

 Samuthirakani as Vetri
 Mahesh as Kathir
 Mithra Kurian as Nethra
 Vivek as Sundar Raj
 Geetha Vijayan
 A. C. Murali Mohan
 Vasu Vikram
 Suresh Sakaria as Arun
 Munnar Ramesh
 Rajendranath
 Birla Bose
 Theepetti Ganesan
 Madhu
 Cheryline

Production
The film, directed by film student Victor Davidson, highlighted a theme regarding contemporary social issues in India. The film began production in 2013 under the title of Aadhar and an audio launch event was held in February 2014 with director Pandiraj attending as a chief guest. Despite having a trailer released soon after, the film took more than a year to have a theatrical release.

Release
The film had a low key release in early June 2015 and received mixed reviews from critics. A reviewer from The New Indian Express wrote that "Budhanin Sirippu would have been a meaningful film if only the script had been crafted in a more coherent way" and concluded that the film had "lacklustre narration". Another critic lamented the film for being "too preachy".

References

2015 films
2010s Tamil-language films
Films about social issues in India
2000s Tamil-language films
2015 directorial debut films